Newbold is an unincorporated community located in the town of Newbold, Oneida County, Wisconsin, United States.

History
The community was named for Fred Newbold, the nephew of a railroad official.

References

Unincorporated communities in Oneida County, Wisconsin
Unincorporated communities in Wisconsin